Maria de Lourdes Ramos Rivera (born August 6, 1960) is a Puerto Rican politician who currently serves in the Puerto Rican House of Representatives, elected at-large from March 26, 1996 – January 2, 2001 and from January 2, 2005 to the present.

Early years and studies

Ramos was born in Juncos, Puerto Rico on August 6, 1960. She completed a Bachelor's degree in Business Administration from the University of Puerto Rico, with a major as Executive Secretary.

Public service

Ramos began her career as Secretary of the Municipal Assembly of Juncos. In 1991, she was appointed as member of the Women's Affair Commission by then Governor Pedro Rosselló.

Political career

In 1995, Ramos successfully presented her candidacy to fill a vacant seat in the House of Representatives of Puerto Rico due to the resignation of Representative Jorge L. Navarro Alicea. Ramos was sworn in on March 26, 1996 as a Representative At-large under the New Progressive Party (PNP), becoming the first female from Juncos to occupy the position.

Ramos was officially elected in the 1996 general election, where she was the representative who received the most votes of all 11 winning candidates. In 1997, the Citizen Action Committee of Carolina gave her the Jesús T. Piñero Award. Still, after one term, Ramos was defeated for re-election at the 2000 general election, where she was the candidate with the fewest votes.

Ramos returned to the House of Representatives in 2004. After being sworn in, she was selected by her party as Majority Whip for that term.

After being reelected in 2008, Ramos was appointed to preside the House Retirement Systems Committee. She was also a member of the House Government, Municipal Affairs, Consumer Affairs, and Education and Cooperativism Committees.

Ramos was reelected for a fourth term in 2012.

References

|-

1960 births
20th-century American women politicians
20th-century American politicians
21st-century American women politicians
21st-century American politicians
Living people
New Progressive Party members of the House of Representatives of Puerto Rico
People from Juncos, Puerto Rico
Puerto Rican Roman Catholics
Puerto Rican women in politics
University of Puerto Rico alumni